Fairy Tales Told for Children. First Collection. (Danish: Eventyr, fortalte for Børn. Første Samling.) is a collection of nine fairy tales by Hans Christian Andersen. The tales were published in a series of three installments by C. A. Reitzel between May 1835 and April 1837, and represent Andersen's first venture into the fairy tale genre.

The nine tales of the three booklets were collected together and published in one volume and sold at seventy-two shillings. A title page, a table of contents, and a preface by Andersen were published in the volume.

Contents

Fairy Tales Told for Children. First Collection. First Booklet 

Fairy Tales Told for Children. First Collection. First Booklet (Eventyr, fortalte for Børn. Første Samling. Første Hefte) is the first installment. With sixty-one unbound pages, was published on 8 May 1835 and contained four tales:
 "The Tinderbox" ("Fyrtøiet")
 "Little Claus and Big Claus" ("Lille Claus og store Claus")
 "The Princess and the Pea" ("Prindsessen paa Ærten")
 "Little Ida's Flowers" ("Den lille Idas Blomster")

The first three tales were based on folktales Andersen had heard in his childhood while the last tale was completely Andersen's invention and created for Ida Thiele, the daughter of Andersen's early benefactor, the folklorist Just Mathias Thiele. Reitzel paid Andersen thirty rixdollars for the manuscript, and the booklet was priced at twenty-four shillings.

Fairy Tales Told for Children. First Collection. Second Booklet 

Fairy Tales Told for Children. First Collection. Second Booklet (Eventyr, fortalte for Børn. Første Samling. Andet Hefte) is the second installment. Was published on 16 December 1835 and contained three tales:
 "Thumbelina" ("Tommelise")
 "The Naughty Boy" ("Den uartige Dreng")
 "The Traveling Companion" ("Reisekammeraten")

"Thumbelina" was completely Andersen's invention though inspired by "Tom Thumb" and other stories of miniature people. "The Naughty Boy" was based on a poem by Anacreon about Cupid, and "The Traveling Companion" was a ghost story with which Andersen had experimented in 1830.

Fairy Tales Told for Children. First Collection. Third Booklet 

Fairy Tales Told for Children. First Collection. Third Booklet (Eventyr, fortalte for Børn. Første Samling. Tredie Hefte) is the third and last installment. Was published on 7 April 1837 and contained two tales:
 "The Little Mermaid" ("Den lille havfrue")
 "The Emperor's New Clothes" ("Kejserens nye klæder")

"The Little Mermaid" was completely Andersen's creation though influenced by De la Motte Fouqué's "Undine" (1811) and lore about mermaids. The tale established his international reputation. The other tale, "The Emperor's New Clothes", was based on a medieval Spanish story with Arab and Jewish sources. On the eve of the third installment's publication, Andersen changed the end of his tale (the Emperor simply walks in procession) to its now familiar finale of a child calling out, "The Emperor is not wearing any clothes!"

Critical reception 

Danish reviews for the first two booklets appeared in 1836 and were not enthusiastic. Critics disliked the chatty, informal style and an immorality that flew in the face of their expectations that children's literature was meant to educate rather than amuse. The critics discouraged Andersen from pursuing the genre. Andersen believed he was working against the critics' preconceived notions about fairy tales, and temporarily returned to novel-writing. The critical reaction was so severe, he waited a full year before publishing the third installment.

See also

References

External links
 The Hans Christian Andersen Center: A website devoted to Andersen's life and works maintained by The University of Southern Denmark.

1835 books
1835 short stories
1837 books
1837 short stories
Collections of fairy tales
1830s children's books
Short stories by Hans Christian Andersen
Danish children's literature